Loryma marginalis is a species of snout moth in the genus Loryma. It was described by Rothschild in 1921. It is found in Iraq.

References

Moths described in 1921
Pyralini
Moths of Asia